Peter Karadzhov (born March 29, 1975) is a Bulgarian sprint canoer who competed in the mid-1990s. He finished eighth in the K-4 1000 m event at the 1996 Summer Olympics in Atlanta.

He competed in Bulgaria and then competed in Canada. Petar Karadjov began kayaking at the age of 11 in Sofia.

In 1996, he participated at his first Olympic Games with his 3 other teammates in Kayak K-4. Bulgaria came 8th out of 9 in the 1000m race 4K.

References
Sports-Reference.com profile

1975 births
Bulgarian male canoeists
Canoeists at the 1996 Summer Olympics
Living people
Olympic canoeists of Bulgaria